Twin Oaks is an unincorporated community in Kern County, California.

A post office operated at Twin Oaks from 1926 to 1931.

References

Unincorporated communities in Kern County, California
Unincorporated communities in California